Scovell may refer to:
 Claire Scovell LaZebnik, an American author
 Edith Joy Scovell (1907-1999), a British poet
 Eduardo Lefebvre Scovell (1864-1918), a British artist
 Florence Scovel Shinn (1871-1940), an artist-turned spiritual teacher
 George Scovell (1774-1861), British army officer and code-breaker
 Melville Amasa Scovell (1855–1912), American academic
 Nell Scovell, a television writer/creator
 William Scovell Savory (1826-1895), a British surgeon